Justice Shea may refer to:

Daniel J. Shea (judge) (born 1938), associate justice of the Montana Supreme Court
David M. Shea (1922–2003), associate justice of the Connecticut Supreme Court
Donald F. Shea (1925–2019), associate justice of the Rhode Island Supreme Court
Jim Shea (judge) (born 1966), associate justice of the Montana Supreme Court
William J. Shea (1900–1965), associate justice of the Connecticut Supreme Court

See also
Judge Shea (disambiguation)